Lucas Rocha may refer to:

 Lucas Rocha (footballer, born 1991), Brazilian football defender
 Lucas Rocha (footballer, born 1995), Brazilian football centre-back